Alton Asa Lennon (August 17, 1906December 28, 1986) was an American Democratic politician who represented North Carolina in the U.S. House of Representatives and Senate. He first served as an interim appointment to the Senate from 1953–54, unsuccessfully sought re-election, and later represented the Cape Fear region in the House from 1957–73. Lennon is one of very few former senators in modern times elected to the House after leaving the Senate.

Early life and education
Lennon was born in Wilmington, North Carolina August 17, 1906. He was the son of Rosser Yates Lennon and Minnie (High) Lennon. He attended the public schools, and graduated from Wake Forest College in 1929. He was admitted to the bar in 1929 and began practice in Wilmington. He married Karine Welch on October 12, 1933.

Political career
Lennon served as the judge of New Hanover County Recorder's Court from 1934–1942. He was elected to the North Carolina State Senate in 1947, and served until 1951. Lennon was appointed on July 10, 1953, as a Democrat to the United States Senate to fill the vacancy caused by the death of Willis Smith and served from July 10, 1953, to November 28, 1954. He was an unsuccessful candidate for the nomination in 1954 to fill the vacancy. He resumed law practice, then was elected as a Democrat to the 85th Congress, and was reelected to the seven succeeding Congresses (January 3, 1957 – January 3, 1973).

Lennon voted in Congress against civil rights and social legislation, although about half of the constituents in his district were African-Americans or Native Americans. In 1966, he was the only Southerner to vote against citing seven Ku Klux Klan leaders for contempt of Congress. He said, "I never heard it said that Klansmen were subversive or affiliated with any foreign government to overthrow the United States." In 1966, Lennon urged that North Vietnamese ports be bombed, and in 1967 he called for the Justice Department to prosecute Stokely Carmichael, the black activist, for making statements against the military draft.

He declined to seek reelection in 1972. Although he was a Democrat, Lennon campaigned for the re-election of Senator Jesse Helms, the conservative Republican, in 1978.

Personal life and legacy
He was a resident of Wilmington, N.C., until his death there December 28, 1986.

In 1976, the Federal Building and Courthouse at Wilmington was named in his honor.

Notes

References

1906 births
1986 deaths
Wake Forest University alumni
Democratic Party United States senators from North Carolina
Democratic Party members of the United States House of Representatives from North Carolina
20th-century American politicians
Old Right (United States)